Edouard Agneessens (24 August 1842, Brussels – 20 August 1885, Uccle) was a Belgian painter born in Brussels. He studied under Jean-François Portaels from 1859 at the Académie Royale des Beaux-Arts in Brussels, and in 1869 won the Prix de Rome. In 1868, he was one of the founding members of the Société Libre des Beaux-Arts in Brussels.

Agneessens later built up quite a career in Saint-Petersburg, but returned to Brussels in the 1880s. In the latter part of his life he suffered from a mental disorder. His works include Standing Male Nude (1870, sold 16 November 1994), Ladies by a Piano (sold 15 October 1998) and Bloemenstilleven (sold 7 December 2002).

Honours 
 1881: Knight in the Order of Leopold.

Sources
 P. & V. Berko, 1981: Dictionary of Belgian painters born between 1750 & 1875, p. 11 Knokke
 P. Piron, 1999: De Belgische beeldende kunstenaars uit de 19de en 20ste eeuw. Art in Belgium 
 Biographie Nationale, Koninklijke Academie van België, deel XXX

References

1842 births
1885 deaths
Artists from Brussels
19th-century Belgian painters
19th-century Belgian male artists
Académie Royale des Beaux-Arts alumni